M. Ramesh Reddy is an Indian film producer who mainly works in South Indian film industry.

Early life
M. Ramesh Reddy was born in Nangali, Karnataka, belongs from a lower-middle-class family and began working as a contractor. He become a vendor for Infosys in 2012 and met Sudha Murty.

Film career
M. Ramesh Reddy started his career as a film producer in 2017 with his film Uppu Huli Khara. Ramesh Reddy produced Nathicharami in 2018 with actors Sruthi Hariharan and Sanchari Vijay. In 2019 Reddy produced Padde Huli.

Reddy has signed a film with actor Sriimurali, expected release in 2021. He also produced upcoming films Gaalipata 2 and 100.

Filmography

References

Film producers from Karnataka
Kannada film producers
Living people
Year of birth missing (living people)